Anthela limonea is a moth of the Anthelidae family. It is found in Australia.

The initial instars of its caterpillar form have black dorsal markings and have a yellow body.

References

Moths described in 1874
Anthelidae
Moths of Australia